Martin Achkov (Bulgarian: Мартин Ачков; born 10 July 1999) is a Bulgarian footballer who plays as a winger for Septemvri Sofia.

Career
Achkov began his career in CSKA Sofia and Litex Lovech, before moving to Slavia Sofia in the summer of 2019. In January 2020 he was send on loan to Spartak Varna until end of season. 

In the summer of 2020 he signed with Septemvri Sofia. He become main player to the team and helped the team with the promotion to First League in 2022. He complete his professional debut in the first league match of the season against Ludogorets Razgrad.

References

External links
 

1999 births
Living people
Bulgarian footballers
Bulgaria youth international footballers
PFC Litex Lovech players
PFC Slavia Sofia players
FC Septemvri Sofia players
First Professional Football League (Bulgaria) players
Association football midfielders